Concrete Jungle is the debut album by the American hip hop duo Sway & King Tech. The album was released in 1991 by Giant Records. It was nominated for a Bammie Award for best debut album.

According to Tech, the 1990 single release of "Follow 4 Now" sold 40,000 vinyl, 40,000 cassettes and 20,000 CDs. A remix of the song appears on the album.

Critical reception

The Chicago Tribune noted the irony of "Same Old Thang", which criticizes the tiresome sameness of rap music.

Track listing
"Intro"     
"Concrete Jungle"     
"Devastating"     
"Baddest Mutha on 2 Turntables [Remix]"     
"Rock Steady"     
"Let Me See You Move"     
"New Dimension"     
"Future Source"     
"In Control"     
"Bum Rush the Sound"     
"Time 4 Peace"      
"Follow 4 Now [Remix]"     
"It's Not Over"     
"Same Old Thang"

References

Sway & King Tech albums
1990 albums
Giant Records (Warner) albums